Ben Andrews is a Senior Fellow at the Centre for Mathematics and its Applications at the Australian National University. He is known for contributions to geometric analysis, with a majority of his work being in the field of extrinsic geometric flows. He received his Ph.D. from Australian National University in 1993, under the supervision of Gerhard Huisken. As of 2020, he has had eight Ph.D. students.

In 2002, he was an invited speaker at the International Congress of Mathematicians. In 2003, he received the Australian Mathematical Society Medal, along with Andrew Hassell, for distinguished research in the mathematical sciences. In 2012 he became a fellow of the American Mathematical Society.

Publications
Textbooks

 
Notable articles

References 

Year of birth missing (living people)
Living people
20th-century Australian mathematicians
21st-century Australian mathematicians
Academic staff of the Australian National University
Fellows of the American Mathematical Society